Vani Tripathi is former national secretary of Bharatiya Janata Party and an Indian actor who has acted in films like Chalte Chalte and Dushman.

Personal life
Vani's family hails from Uttarakhand and her father was a Professor in Delhi University. She married Gurgaon based Kashmiri Businessman Hemant Tikoo in October 2013.

Political career
Vani Tripathi is the former national secretary of the Bharatiya Janata Party, the ruling party of India, an actor by profession, she has been an activist bringing issues related to youth and women to the notice of various forums and has led several leadership programmes in India and abroad.

Her campaign and outreach programmes focused on encouraging women's participation in politics. As a celebrity campaigner of the BJP, she has also managed campaigns for several candidates, especially women in various parts of India, including cities like Delhi, Mumbai, states of Chhattisgarh, Uttarakhand, Madhya Pradesh and Maharashtra.

Film career and education
Vani has a bachelor's degree in political science from Hindu college, Delhi university.
She has worked with theatre stalwarts like Barry John and Maya Rao besides Ebrahim Alkazi. She has also worked with directors including Mahesh Bhatt, Tanuja Chandra and Kundan Shah. Vani has been deeply involved in theatre, films and television and has worked in projects both in India and abroad.

Vani also worked as an actor-teacher at the National School of Drama's theatre in Education Company for few years situated in New Delhi. Vani Tripathi is actively involved with Madhya Pradesh School of Drama (MPSD). She is doing Eehsaas and Agneepath on the national network.

Filmography

References

External links
 
Official Twitter

Living people
Indian actor-politicians
Women in Delhi politics
Indian television actresses
Actresses from Delhi
Delhi politicians
Bharatiya Janata Party politicians from Delhi
People from New Delhi
1979 births
Actresses in Hindi cinema
20th-century Indian actresses
21st-century Indian women politicians
21st-century Indian politicians